Gerardo Cono Pelusso Boyrie (born February 25, 1954) is a Uruguayan football manager. In 2006 season, he was chosen as the best coach in the country in all sport disciplines by the Uruguayan Olympic Committee.

Al-Arabi
On 28 June 2016, Gerardo Pelusso become manager of Al-Arabi, replacing Gianfranco
Zola as manager.

Honours

Clubs

National teams

References

External links
 

1954 births
Living people
People from Florida Department
Uruguayan footballers
Uruguayan Primera División players
Club Nacional de Football players
Liverpool F.C. (Montevideo) players
S.D. Quito footballers
L.D.U. Quito footballers
C.S. Emelec footballers
Uruguayan expatriate footballers
Expatriate footballers in Ecuador
Uruguayan football managers
Liverpool F.C. (Montevideo) managers
O'Higgins F.C. managers
Racing Club de Montevideo managers
S.D. Aucas managers
C.S. Emelec managers
C.A. Cerro managers
Club Olimpia managers
Danubio F.C. managers
Club Alianza Lima managers
Club Nacional de Football managers
Universidad de Chile managers
Paraguay national football team managers
Independiente Santa Fe managers
Expatriate football managers in Chile
Expatriate football managers in Colombia
Expatriate football managers in Peru
Expatriate football managers in Ecuador
Expatriate football managers in Paraguay
Atlético Potosino footballers
Al-Arabi SC (Qatar) managers
Association football midfielders